Galmoy GAA is a Gaelic Athletic Association club located in Galmoy, County Kilkenny, Ireland. The club is primarily concerned with the game of hurling.

History

Located in the village of Galmoy, on the Laois-Kilkenny border, Galmoy GAA Club was founded in December 1929. The club has spent most of its existence operating in the junior grade, winning three Kilkenny JHC titles and 13 divisional titles. A brief period in the Kilkenny SHC saw the club lose to James Stephens in the 1975 final. Galmoy defeated Oran to become the first Kilkenny winners of the All-Ireland Junior Club Championship in 2005.

Honours

All-Ireland Junior Club Hurling Championship (1): 2005
Leinster Junior Club Hurling Championship (1): 2004
Kilkenny Junior Hurling Championship (3): 1949, 1966, 2004
Northern Kilkenny Junior Hurling Championship (13): 1931, 1949, 1952, 1954, 1963, 1965, 1966, 1987, 1989, 1997, 2004, 2013, 2015

Notable players

 Billy Drennan: All-Ireland U20HC-winner (2022)

References

Gaelic games clubs in County Kilkenny
Hurling clubs in County Kilkenny